The First Presbyterian Church at 101 S. Lafayette in South Bend, Indiana is a former Presbyterian church building of First Presbyterian Church.  It was built in 1888 and is a Richardsonian Romanesque style building constructed of fieldstonewith limestone trim. It has a cross-gable roof and features arched entrances, a massive Palladian window of stained glass, and a corner bell tower.

It was listed on the National Register of Historic Places in 1985 as Former First Presbyterian Church.

The congregation of First Presbyterian Church is currently located at 333 W. Colfax Ave in downtown South Bend. The current church was completed in 1952.

References

External links

Church website

Churches on the National Register of Historic Places in Indiana
Romanesque Revival church buildings in Indiana
Churches completed in 1888
Former churches in Indiana
Churches in South Bend, Indiana
Presbyterian churches in Indiana
Churches in St. Joseph County, Indiana
National Register of Historic Places in St. Joseph County, Indiana